Eugene Germanovich Vodolazkin (Евгений Германович Водолазкин) is a Russian scholar and author. Born in Kyiv in 1964, he graduated from the Philological Department of Kyiv University in 1986. In the same year, he entered graduate school at the Pushkin House in the department of Old Russian literature under Dmitry Likhachov. In 1990, he defended his graduate thesis 'On the Translation of the "Chronicle of George Hamartolos"'.

Vodolazkin has been awarded fellowships from the Toepfer Foundation and Alexander von Humboldt Foundation, and won the Solzhenitsyn Prize in 2019. His novel Laurus (Лавр) won the Russian Big Book Award as well as the Yasnaya Polyana Literary Award. He has published in the Christian journals First Things and Plough.

Vodolazkin is considered to be the most important figure in contemporary Russian literature. His novels have been translated into several languages.

Personal life 
Vodolazkin was born in 1964 in Kyiv, when it was still part of the USSR. Though he is private about his childhood, he attended a school that focused on both Ukrainian and English languages, from which he graduated in 1981. He went on to attend Kyiv University, where he studied philology, and the Pushkin House (known at the time as the Institute of Russian Literature). The Pushkin House is where Vodolazkin met his wife, Tatiana Robertovna Rudi. He defended his thesis in 1990, and his examiner Dmitry Likhachov offered him a faculty position. Vodolazkin lives in St. Petersburg.

Works

Scholarly publications 
World History in Literature of Ancient Russia (based on XI - XV materials)
Dmitry Likhachov and his Epoch: Memoirs, Essays, Documents, Photographs

Novels
The Abduction of Europa (2005)
Solovyov and Larionov, Andrei Bely Prize, Big Book Award shortlist
Laurus (2012), Yasnaya Polyana Literary Award, 21st century category, win; Big Book Award, first prize
The Aviator (2015), Big Book Award, second prize
House and Island: Language Tool (2015)
Brisbane (2018)
The Pet Market (2019)
Go Dauntlessly (2020)
Justification of the Island(2020)
Sister of Four (2020)

References

1964 births
Living people
21st-century Russian novelists
Date of birth missing (living people)
Place of birth missing (living people)
Writers from Saint Petersburg
Taras Shevchenko National University of Kyiv alumni